The Taça de Moçambique, also known as Taça Moçambique (meaning Cup of Mozambique) is the second most important football competition of Mozambique, and it is organized by the Mozambican Football Federation. The competition's first edition was competed for in 1978.

Competition format 
The competition is a one-legged single-elimination tournament between teams from all over the country.

The competition is divided in two parts. In the first part, which is called Fase Provincial (meaning Provincial Stage), clubs are split into regional groups in which they play against teams from the same province.

The second part of the cup, which is called Fase Nacional (meaning National Stage), is contested between 16 clubs, qualified from the Provincial Stage.

List of champions

Titles by team

References

External links 
 RSSSF

Football competitions in Mozambique
Mozambique
Recurring sporting events established in 1978